Pratik Das (born 10 February 1994) is an Indian first-class cricketer who plays for Odisha. He made his first-class debut against Rajasthan in January 2015.

References

External links
 

1994 births
Living people
Indian cricketers
Odisha cricketers
Sportspeople from Bhubaneswar
Cricketers from Odisha